Gullstein Church is a parish church of the Church of Norway in Aure Municipality in Møre og Romsdal county, Norway. It is located in the village of Gullstein, on the western coast of the island of Tustna. It is the main church for the Tustna parish which is part of the Ytre Nordmøre prosti (deanery) in the Diocese of Møre. The white, wooden church was built in a long church design in 1869 by the architect Christian Christie. The church seats about 300 people.

History
Historically, the island of Tustna was part of the Edøy Church parish. This was sometimes a very difficult journey for the people of Tustna to get to church. During the 1850s, it is said that a total of 20 people died while crossing the fjord to go to church. In 1860, the people of the island of Tustna petitioned for their own church on the island. The formalities of approvals, planning, and construction took nearly ten years to complete, but the church was finally completed in 1869. It was designed by Christian Christie and built in the village of Gullstein on the east coast of the island. The new church was consecrated on 21 November 1869. The wooden long church has a tower on the west end and a sacristy on the north side of the chancel which sits on the east end.

See also
List of churches in Møre

References

Aure, Norway
Churches in Møre og Romsdal
Long churches in Norway
Wooden churches in Norway
19th-century Church of Norway church buildings
Churches completed in 1869
1869 establishments in Norway